Livets ändhållplats is the second album by Shining. It was released originally on Selbstmord Services, in 2001 on white splatter vinyl limited to 555 copies.

Several re-issues exist:
Reissue in 2003 by Avantgarde Music
Reissue in 2004 by Modern Invasion (Australia), includes a bonus track "Manipulation Mass"
Reissue in 2005 by Osmose Productions, includes a bonus track "Manipulation Mass"

Track listing

Personnel
 Niklas Kvarforth - vocals, guitar, keyboard
 Tusk - bass guitar
 Ted Wedebrand - drums

Shining (Swedish band) albums
2001 albums